A. Kalenahalli  is a village in the southern state of Karnataka, India. For revenue and land management purposes it is under Dandiganahalli Hobli, of Channarayapatna Taluka of Hassan District in Karnataka state; for other administrative and governmental purposes it is under Kumbenahalli gram panchayat of Channarayapatna Taluka.

See also
 Hassan District

References

External links
 

Villages in Hassan district